Upton is a small village in the English county of Nottinghamshire. It is located north of Askham and south of Headon; with the latter it forms the civil parish of Headon cum Upton. The population of this civil parish at the 2011 census was 253.

Sources
Google Maps

References

Villages in Nottinghamshire
Bassetlaw District